The enzyme 3-dehydroquinate synthase (EC 4.2.3.4) catalyzes the chemical reaction

[[3-deoxy-D-arabino-hept-2-ulosonate 7-phosphate]]  3-dehydroquinate + phosphate

The protein uses NAD+ to catalyze the reaction. This reaction is part of the shikimate pathway which is involved in the biosynthesis of aromatic amino acids.

3-Dehydroquinate synthase belongs to the family of lyases, to be specific those carbon-oxygen lyases acting on phosphates. This enzyme participates in phenylalanine, tyrosine, and tryptophan biosynthesis.  It employs one cofactor, cobalt (Co2+).

Background
The shikimate pathway is composed of seven steps, each catalyzed by an enzyme.  The shikimate pathway is responsible for producing the precursors for aromatic amino acids, which are essential to our diets because we cannot synthesize them in our bodies. Only plants, bacteria, and microbial eukaryotes are capable of producing aromatic amino acids. The pathway ultimately converts phosphoenolpyruvate and 4-erythrose phosphate into chorismate, the precursor to aromatic amino acids. 3-Dehydroquinate synthase is the enzyme that catalyzes reaction in the second step of this pathway. This second step of the reaction eliminates a phosphate from 3-deoxy-D-arabino-heptulosonate 7-phosphate, which results in 3-dehydroquinate.  3-Dehydroquinate synthase is a monomeric enzyme, and has a molecular weight of 39,000. 3-dehydroquinate synthase is activated by inorganic phosphate, and requires NAD+ for activity, although the reaction in total is neutral when catalyzed by an enzyme.

Function 
3-Dehydroquinate synthase utilizes a complex multi-step mechanism that includes alcohol oxidation, phosphate β-elimination, carbonyl reduction, ring opening, and intramolecular aldol condensation.
Dehydroquinate synthase requires NAD+ and a cobalt cofactor to catalyze the conversion of 3-deoxy-D-arabino-heptulosonate 7-phosphate into 3-dehydroquinate. Dehydroquinate synthase is of particular interest because of its complicated activity relative to its small size. In most bacteria, this enzyme has only one function. However, in fungi and protists, it is part of the pentafunctional AROM complex that comprises steps two, three, four, five and six of the shikimate pathway. Together with 3-dehydroquinate dehydratase, 3-dehydroquinate synthase forms the core of this complex.

Applications
3-Dehydroquinate synthase catalyzes the second step in the shikimate pathway, which is essential for the production of aromatic amino acids in bacteria, plants, and fungi, but not mammals. This makes it an ideal target for new antimicrobial agents, anti-parasitic agents, and herbicides. Other enzymes in the shikimate pathway have already been targeted and put to use as herbicides. Roundup, a common herbicide made by Monsanto, works by inhibiting another enzyme in the shikimate pathway. The shikimate pathway is an ideal choice for herbicides because this pathway does not exist in animals or people so people are not directly affected.  Roundup uses an enzyme inhibitor, glyphosate, to block one of the steps of the shikimate pathway.  Glyphosate inhibits 5-enolpyruvylshikimate-3-phosphate synthase (EPSP synthase), which ultimately blocks the production of aromatic amino acids, and, without aromatic amino acids, plants cannot survive. However, Monsanto developed a bacterial form of EPSP synthase that was not inhibited by Roundup.  Monsanto introduced this gene into plants using agrobacterium and the result was a plant that was resistant to Roundup.  This meant that all plants without the bacterial gene would die, leading a much higher degree of weed control.

Nomenclature 

The systematic name of this enzyme class is 3-deoxy-D-arabino-hept-2-ulosonate-7-phosphate phosphate-lyase (cyclizing; 3-dehydroquinate-forming). Other names in common use include 5-dehydroquinate synthase, 5-dehydroquinic acid synthetase, dehydroquinate synthase, 3-dehydroquinate synthetase, 3-deoxy-arabino-heptulosonate-7-phosphate phosphate-lyase, (cyclizing), and 3-deoxy-arabino-heptulonate-7-phosphate phosphate-lyase (cyclizing).

References

Further reading 

 
 
 
 

EC 4.2.3
Cobalt enzymes
Enzymes of known structure